The binomial name Aerides lobbii refers to 2 species of orchids:
Aerides lobbii Lem., a synonym of Aerides multiflora
Aerides lobbii Teijsm. & Binn, a synonym of Thrixspermum calceolus